The River Ugie (Scottish Gaelic: Uisge Ùigidh) or Ugie Water is a river in North East Scotland; it flows into the North Sea on the east coast at Peterhead, north of Cruden Bay. There is considerable evidence of prehistoric settlement within the Ugie drainage basin, especially in the South Ugie Water catchment basin. For example, the Catto Long Barrow is found somewhat to the south of the Ugie Water mainstem.

The river has two crossings: Balmoor Bridge, just north of Peterhead, and the George Birnie Memorial Bridge, a pedestrian bridge at Peterhead Golf Club.

Tributaries
 North Ugie Water
 South Ugie Water

Settlements

(from west to east)
 Old Deer
 Stuartfield
 Mintlaw
 Inverquhomery
 Longside
 Rora
 Newseat
 Inverugie
 Peterhead

See also
Laeca Burn

References

Ugie